Pillard is a French surname that may refer to
Grace Graupe-Pillard, American artist 
Nina Pillard (born 1961), United States Circuit Judge
Richard Pillard (born 1933), American psychiatrist
Maurice Pillard Verneuil (1869–1942), French artist and decorator in the Art nouveau movement

French-language surnames